This article contains information about the literary events and publications of 1695.

Events
April – The Parliament of England decides not to renew the Licensing Order of 1643, thus effectively abolishing most press censorship.
unknown dates
After twelve years of de facto theatrical monopoly in London, the senior actors of the mismanaged United Company break away to form a rival cooperative company led by Thomas Betterton, Elizabeth Barry and Anne Bracegirdle. This makes a brilliant start with the première on April 30 of William Congreve's comedy Love for Love, at the New Theatre, Lincoln's Inn Fields.
Antoine Le Maistre and his brother Louis-Isaac Lemaistre de Sacy complete their translation of the Catholic Bible into French (the Bible de Port-Royal).
Wren Library, Cambridge, the library of Trinity College, designed by Christopher Wren, is completed.

New books

Prose
Mary Astell (anonymous) – A Serious Proposal to the Ladies, for the Advancement of Their True and Greatest Interest
Charles Blount – Miscellaneous Works (ed. Charles Gildon)
Gilbert Burnet – An Essay on the Memory of the Late Queen (see 1694 in literature, as many memorials were written to Mary II of England)
Jeremy Collier – Miscellanies upon Moral Subjects: The second part
John Dennis – The Court of Death
John Dryden – De Arte Graphica (trans. of Charles Alphonse du Fresnoy)
Laurence Echard – The Roman History (vol. I)
"N. H." – The Ladies Dictionary, being a general entertainment of the fair-sex: a work never attempted before in English (published by John Dunton)
Nicolaas Heinsius the Younger – The Delightful Adventures and Wonderful Life of Mirandor
William Laud – The History of the Troubles and Tryal of William Laud
John Locke
Further Considerations Concerning Raising the Value of Money
The Reasonableness of Christianity as Delivered in the Scriptures
A Vindication of the Reasonableness of Christianity (reply to John Edwards)
John Norris – Letters Concerning the Love of God (letters to Mary Astell)
Sir William Petty – Quantulumcunque Concerning Money (published posthumously)
John Phillips – A Reflection on Our Modern Poetry
Sujan Rai – Khulasat-ut-Tawarikh
Robert South – Tritheism (vs. William Sherlock)
Sir William Temple – An Introduction to the History of England
Lionel Wafer – A New Voyage and Description of the Isthmus of America
Ned Ward – Female Policy Detected; or, The Arts of a Designing Woman Laid Open
Wu Chucai and Wu Diaohou (compiled and edited) – Guwen Guanzhi, anthology of more than 200 works from Warring States period to Ming dynasty

Children
Charles Perrault –  (Tales and stories of the past with morals. Tales of Mother Goose)

Drama
John Banks – Cyrus the Great
Catherine Trotter Cockburn – Agnes de Castro
William Congreve – Love for Love
Robert Gould – The Rival Sisters
George Granville – The She-Gallants
Charles Hopkins – Pyrrhus King of Epirus
Peter Anthony Motteux – The Loves of Mars and Venus
George Powell – Bonduca, or the British Heroine
Elkanah Settle – Philaster; or, Love Lies A-Bleeding (adapted from Fletcher's Philaster)
Thomas Scott – The Mock Marriage
Thomas Southerne – Oroonoko, or The Royal Slave: a tragedy (adapted from Aphra Behn's novel Oroonoko)
Ariadne – She Ventures and He Wins

Poetry
Joseph Addison – A Poem to His Majesty
Richard Blackmore – Prince Arthur
Colley Cibber – A Poem on the Death of our Late Sovereign Lady, Queen Mary
William Congreve – The Mourning Muse of Alexas: A pastoral (on Mary II)
John Milton – The Poetical Works of Mr John Milton (ed. Patrick Hume)
Matthew Prior – An English Ballad: In answer to Mr Despreaux's Pindarique ode on the taking of Namure
Richard Steele – The Procession: A poem on Her Majesties funeral
See also 1695 in poetry

Births
April 8 – Johann Christian Günther, German poet (died 1723)
September 20 – Hedvig Catharina Lillie, Swedish salonnière (died 1745)

Deaths
February 7 – Dorothy Osborne (Lady Temple), English letter writer (born 1627)
April 13 – Jean de la Fontaine, French poet and fabulist (born 1621)
April 17 – Juana Inés de la Cruz, Mexican poet (born 1651; plague)
April 23 – Henry Vaughan, Welsh metaphysical poet (born 1622)
June 11 – André Félibien, French court historian (born 1619)
August 12 – Huang Zongxi, Chinese political theorist (born 1610)
October – Sir William Killigrew, English playwright and courtier (born 1606)
November 28 – Anthony Wood, English antiquary (born 1632)

References

 
Years of the 17th century in literature